Neill Michael Daunt OBE (23 October 1909 – 26 July 1991) was a British test pilot; the first person to fly the Gloster Meteor in March 1943, Britain's first production jet aircraft. He was the second person to fly the Gloster E.28/39 "Pioneer" (Britain's first jet aircraft) in November 1942. He had many severe accidents that he was lucky to survive, including one for which he had no recollection.

Early life
Michael Daunt was born in Sussex. His father was a General Practitioner (GP). Michael went to St Catharine's College, Cambridge where he studied Engineering. He learnt to fly with the Cambridge University Air Squadron (CUAS).

Career

He joined the RAF on a short service commission serving in 25 Squadron. He played rugby union for the RAF as a three-quarter back. 

He became a flying instructor for de Havilland at the de Havilland Flying School in 1935.

Hawker
He became a test pilot for Hawker Aircraft in 1935.

Gloster Aircraft
The early jet aircraft for Gloster were designed and built at the Bentham Works in Gloucestershire. He joined Gloster – owned by Hawker – in 1937 as Deputy Chief Test Pilot. He became Chief Test Pilot of Gloster in 1942 when the previous pilot, Gerry Sayer, was lost presumed killed in an accident flying a Hawker Typhoon on 21 October 1942. Most of his test flying took place at Brockworth, Gloucestershire. He flew the Gloster E.28/39 on 6 November 1942 at RAF Edgehill in Oxfordshire, near Shenington off the A422. He took the only known picture of the E.28/39 first flight in May 1941.

He retired from test flying in June 1944 when the Meteor he was flying had a full compressor failure in mid-air and he was lucky enough to have a safe landing.

Meteor first flight
On 3 February 1940, Gloster was given the contract for Britain's first F9/40 jet fighter, before any British jet aircraft had flown. On 7 February 1941, the Minister of Aircraft Production ordered twelve (reduced to eight later) Meteor prototypes. The twin engine design was chosen because the engines available were not powerful enough for a single-engine design. The first Meteor (Gloster F9/40) prototype was moved to RAF Cranwell in Lincolnshire on 12 February 1943. On 5 March 1943 Daunt flew the Meteor, prototype DG206, on the Meteor's first flight. It was not fitted with Power Jets W.2 engines, but the de Havilland Halford H-1. The first flight lasted three and a half minutes, as the aircraft began to yaw violently from side to side. The second flight of the Meteor was on 17 April 1943. He flew the first Meteor (DG205) powered by Power Jets jet engines on 12 June 1943. Another Meteor prototype, DG204, flew with the axial-flow Metropolitan-Vickers F.2 jet engine in November 1943, which was the fifth Meteor prototype, and the Metropolitan-Vickers (MetroVick) engines outperformed those of Power Jets. An order was made for 300 Meteors, but due to engine problems, this first order was reduced to 20 aircraft.

Michael Daunt flew the first production (military) version of the Meteor Mk 1, equipped with four 20mm Hispano cannon, EE210/G, on 12 June 1944. The Meteor entered service in July 1944. 

The Messerschmitt Me 262 V3 prototype first flew on 18 July 1942 at Leipheim with the Junkers Jumo 004 axial-flow jet engine, piloted by Fritz Wendel.

Farming
Michael Daunt became a farmer after the war in south-west Oxfordshire, close to what is today the M40 motorway. From 1969 to 1976 he was Chief Technician of the kidney unit of the Wordsley Hospital in Kingswinford.

Personal life
He was awarded the OBE in the 1945 Birthday Honours for services to test flying. He married Sheila Sigrist, the daughter of Frederick Sigrist (1884–1956) the Joint Managing Director of Hawker, in 1936 in London. After divorce, he married Monica Claire Parnell in 1947 in Ploughley Rural District, and they had a daughter on 5 November 1948 and a son on 10 June 1950. He lived at Pyrton, now in South Oxfordshire and then in Kent, South Wales, Hertfordshire, Devon and Oldbury in the West Midlands.  His third wife Monica died in May 1989.

He died in Ipswich on 26 July 1991.

References

 Times obituary, Tuesday 30 July 1991, page 16
 Jet Pioneers: Gloster and the Birth of the Jet Age
 Meteor Boys: True Tales from the Operators of Britain's First Jet

External links
 Engine history

1909 births
1991 deaths
Alumni of St Catharine's College, Cambridge
British aviation pioneers
English test pilots
Gloster Meteor
Officers of the Order of the British Empire
Royal Air Force officers
People from Sussex
People from South Oxfordshire District
Military personnel from Sussex